Barco ColorTone was a stripped-down version of the Barco Creator image manipulation program. It was originally developed for IRIX, and only featured the base "CT-Brix", brush and colour correction modules. An additional "image quality estimator" module, not featured in Creator, was also added.

Later it was ported as a standalone program to Windows NT. Esko continued to support it after the Barco Graphics division merged with Purup-Eskofot to form Esko Graphics. Now known as Esko ColorTone, the current 3.0 version also features the optional CT-Brix modules "InkSwitch" and "BlackSmith" in addition to the "FlexoFix" filter.

The last version was 7.0 build 70511 released with Esko Software Suite 10. Some time prior to August, 2013 Esko ceased selling the ColorTone program*.

External links
Obituary at esko.com

References

Barco Graphics software
Raster graphics editors
IRIX software
Technical communication tools